Ana Rucner (born 12 February 1983) is a Croatian cellist. She represented Bosnia and Herzegovina in the Eurovision Song Contest 2016 with Dalal Midhat-Talakić, Deen and Jasmin Fazlić Jala with the song "Ljubav je" performing it on 10 May 2016 in the first semi-final but failed to qualify to the final.

In the 2017 Zagreb local elections Rucner was elected member of the Zagreb City Assembly as a candidate of Milan Bandić's party list.

She was married to Croatian singer Vlado Kalember and has one child with him.

References

External links
 Her web page

Eurovision Song Contest entrants of 2016
1983 births
Living people
Eurovision Song Contest entrants for Bosnia and Herzegovina
Croatian cellists
Musicians from Zagreb
Women cellists
21st-century women musicians
21st-century cellists